Rampara is a village in the area of Talala-Gir district Gir Somnath of the state of Gujarat in India. It is surrounded by the Talala-gir.
This village is known for its famous Kesar Mango

References 

Villages in Gir Somnath district